Barnafoss is also known as Bjarnafoss , which was its previous name. Barnafoss is near Hraunfossar which burst out of Hallmundarhraun which is a great lava plain. Barnafoss is on the river Hvítá in Borgarfjörður. Hraunfossar flows out of a lava field into Hvítá near Barnafoss, creating a stunning scenery.

In mythology
Many Icelandic folk tales have been associated with Barnafoss, the most famous being about two boys from a nearby farm, Hraunsás. One day, the boys' parents went with their ploughmen to a church. The boys were supposed to stay at home, but as they grew bored they decided to follow their parents. They made a shortcut and crossed a natural stone-bridge that was above the waterfall. But on their way, they felt dizzy and fell into the water and drowned. When their mother found out what had happened, she put a spell on the bridge saying that nobody would ever cross it without drowning himself. A little while later, the bridge was demolished in an earthquake.

Another waterfall, Barnafoss, is on the river Skjálfandafljót near the abandoned farm Barnafell in Ljósavatn County. According to legends, young and brave men jumped across its narrowest parts. During prolonged subzero periods, the spray creates an ice arch across the river above the waterfall and sometimes a rope was strung across the river there to quicken this development. Flocks of sheep were driven over that bridge to graze on Þingey, the island between the two branches of the river.

External links

 Painting by A. Jónsson

Waterfalls of Iceland
Borgarbyggð
West Volcanic Zone of Iceland